The 2003 Leeward Islands Junior Championships in Athletics took place on May 31–June 1, 2003.  The event was held at the A. O. Shirley Recreation Ground in Road Town, Tortola, British Virgin Islands.  A detailed report was published.

A total of 44 events were contested, 22 by boys and 22 by girls.

Medal summary
Complete results were published.

Boys (U-20)

†: Open event for both U20 and U17 athletes.

Girls (U-20)

†: Open event for both U20 and U17 athletes.

Boys (U-17)

Girls (U-17)

Medal table (unofficial)

Team trophies
The scores for the team trophy were published.

Participation
According to an unofficial count, 164 athletes from 7 countries participated.

 (8)
 (30)
 (28)
 (27)
 (38)
 (23)
 (10)

References

2003
Leeward Islands Junior Championships in Athletics
Leeward Islands Junior Championships in Athletics
2003 in youth sport